St Mary's Church or St Mary the Immaculate Church is a Roman Catholic parish church in Grantham, Lincolnshire, England. It was built in phases from 1833 to the 1960s and initially designed by E. J. Willson in the neoclassical style, and later by Gerard Goalen. It is located on the corner of North Parade and Barrowby Road to the north of the town centre. It is a Grade II listed building.

History

Construction
In 1830, Thomas Tempest bought the site of the current church. He also paid for the church's construction. In 1831, the foundation stone was laid. In 1833, the first Mass was celebrated. The architect was E. J. Willson who designed the church in the neoclassical style and linked to the presbytery, which was built in 1829. In 1833, a school was built. In 1859, the school was rebuilt. In 1928, the school was relocated. In 1884, the western apse was added.

Extension
From 1964 to 1965, the church was extended northwards. The old sacristy became the baptistry. The entrance was moved to current location. The architect was Gerard Goalen. The mixture of classical and modern, according to Historic England created an "attractive working church", with the modern additions being "of merit".

Parish
St Mary's Church is its own parish. It has two Sunday Masses at 6:00pm on Saturday and at 9:30am on Sunday.

See also
 Diocese of Nottingham

References

External links
 

Buildings and structures in Grantham
Roman Catholic churches in Lincolnshire
Grade II listed churches in Lincolnshire
Roman Catholic churches completed in 1833
Grade II listed Roman Catholic churches in England
19th-century Roman Catholic church buildings in the United Kingdom
Neoclassical church buildings in England